Ho Kham is a sub-district (tambon) in Mueang Bueng Kan District, in Bueng Kan Province, northeastern Thailand. As of 2012, it had a population of 7,116 people and has jurisdiction over 14 villages. It lies on Highway 212 and the Mekong River and border with Laos, west of Khai Si and Bueng Kan.

History
The sub-district was created in 1975, when eight administrative villages were split from Nong Sawang Sub-district (then still named Nong Kheng) to form the new sub-district.

Administration
The sub-district is divided into 14 administrative villages (mubans). The sub-district municipality Ho Kham is the local government responsible for the sub-district, and covers the same area as the sub-district.

References

External links
ThaiTambon.com

Tambon of Bueng Kan province
Populated places in Bueng Kan province
Populated places on the Mekong River